Phichit (เมือง) is a town (thesaban mueang) in central Thailand, capital of Phichit Province. It covers the whole tambon Nai Mueang of Mueang Phichit district, an area of 12.017 km². As of 2005 it had a population of 23,791. Phichit is 326 km north of Bangkok.

Geography
Phichit is at the confluence of the Wat Ta Yom River and the Nan River.

History
The old town of Phichit was established in 1058 CE by Phraya Kotabongthevaraja, and was first part of the Sukhothai kingdom, and later of Ayutthaya. The name of the city changed several times. At first it was called Sra Luang (city of the royal pond), in Ayutthaya times it was called Okhaburi ("city in the swamp"), and then finally Phichit ("beautiful city").

Attractions
The Wat Tha Luang temple in Phichit is home to a large Luang Phor Phet Buddha image.

Notable individuals
 Chaleo Yoovidhya (c. 1932 – 17 March 2012) once listed as the richest person in Thailand

External links

Populated places in Phichit province
Cities and towns in Thailand